The 1990 Senior League World Series took place from August 12–18 in Kissimmee, Florida, United States. Taipei, Taiwan defeated Danville, California in the championship game. It was Taiwan's third straight title.

In an effort to boost attendance, the Host team was re-introduced.

Teams

Results

Winner's Bracket

Loser's Bracket

Placement Bracket

Elimination Round

References

Senior League World Series
Senior League World Series
1990 in sports in Florida